Glyptoderma is a fungal genus in the family Agaricaceae. It is a monotypic genus, containing the single species Glyptoderma coelatum.

See also
 List of Agaricaceae genera
 List of Agaricales genera

References

Agaricaceae
Monotypic Agaricales genera